

Kaban may refer to:

People 
 Kaban, a Khazar ruler; See Khalga and Kaban
 An Israeli military psychologist; See Profile 21
 Jozef Kabaň, a Slovak automobile designer
 Family name (Kabán). They live in Hungary.

Places 
 Kaban Lakes, lakes in Kazan, Republic of Tatarstan, Russia
 Kaban, Queensland, a locality in the Tablelands Region, Queensland, Australia
 Kaban, Olur

Other 
 "Kaban" (Masterpiece song), 2016
 A variation of cavan, a unit of measurement in the Philippines

See also
 Kanban, a scheduling system for lean manufacturing and just-in-time manufacturing